The Seventeenth Legislative Assembly of Uttar Pradesh (Seventeenth Vidhan Sabha of Uttar Pradesh) was constituted on 19 March 2017 as a result of Uttar Pradesh Legislative Assembly election, 2017 held between 11 February to 8 March 2017. The Legislative Assembly had total of 404 MLAs (including one nominated Anglo-Indian member, Dr. Denzil J. Godin). 

The term of the 17th assembly was from 19 March 2017 to 12 March 2022.

Important members

Strength at the time of dissolution

Result

Elected members

See also

 Uttar Pradesh Legislative Assembly
 2012 Uttar Pradesh Legislative Assembly election
 2017 Uttar Pradesh Legislative Assembly election
 2022 Uttar Pradesh Legislative Assembly election

References

Uttar Pradesh Legislative Assembly
Uttar Pradesh MLAs 2017–2022